Li Chan-myung (a.k.a. Ri Chan Myong; ; born 2 January 1947) is a North Korean football goalkeeper who played for North Korea in the 1966 FIFA World Cup. He also played for Kigwancha Sports Club.

References

1947 births
North Korean footballers
North Korea international footballers
Association football goalkeepers
1966 FIFA World Cup players
Living people